Lisa Raymond and Rennae Stubbs were the defending champions, but lost in third round to Kim Clijsters and Meghann Shaughnessy.

Virginia Ruano Pascual and Paola Suárez won the title, defeating Elena Dementieva and Janette Husárová 6–2, 6–1 in the final. It was the 1st doubles Grand Slam title and the 6th doubles title in the year for the pair. It was also the 16th doubles title overall for Ruano Pascual and the 24th doubles title overall for Suárez, in their respective careers.

Seeds

Draw

Finals

Top half

Section 1

Section 2

Bottom half

Section 3

Section 4

External links
 Official results archive (WTA)
2002 US Open – Women's draws and results at the International Tennis Federation

 

2002 US Open (tennis)
2002 WTA Tour
US Open (tennis) by year – Women's doubles
2002 in women's tennis
2002 in American women's sports